Lesnoye Tatarintsevo is a rural locality (a village) in Denisovskoye Rural Settlement, Gorokhovetsky District, Vladimir Oblast, Russia. The population was 4 as of 2010.

Geography 
Lesnoye Tatarintsevo is located 32 km southwest of Gorokhovets (the district's administrative centre) by road. Denisovo is the nearest rural locality.

References 

Rural localities in Gorokhovetsky District